Welcome to Red Hook Houses is a collaboration album by rappers and Sunz of Man members Hell Razah and Shabazz the Disciple, under the name T.H.U.G. Angelz (Those Humbled Under God), released on July 8, 2008 through Babygrande Records. The album features production from Bronze Nazareth, Jordan River Banks of Godz Wrath, Rated R, Shroom, Vanderslice and Blue Sky Black Death, who provide a remix for the track "Audiobiography", originally featured on the 2007 BSBD/Razah album Razah's Ladder. The album's only guest appearance comes from original Sunz of Man member 7th Ambassador. The album is the first of two planned collaborative albums between the rappers, with the second upcoming project to be produced entirely by Ayatollah.

Track listing

References 

2008 albums
Shabazz the Disciple albums
Hell Razah albums
Babygrande Records albums